Ed Niehaus is an American CEO and publicist.

Along with partners Bill Ryan and Melody Haller, Niehaus founded Niehaus Ryan Haller (NRH) which served the Internet industry during the rapid growth period of the 1990s.

NRH provided public relations services to O'Reilly & Associates' experimental web publishing project Global Network Navigator and was the company Yahoo! chose to handle its public image during the period from 1994 to 2000. In the late 1990s, Steve Jobs approached Niehaus to assist him with his efforts to turn around Apple Computer; NRH became Apple's agency of record.

Niehaus served as the CEO of Fluid, Inc., an interactive merchandising company based in San Francisco, CA.

Niehaus is currently president and CEO of the design firm Cooper and chairman of the board of Collaborative Drug Discovery].

External links 
Branding Is Dead! Long Live Sustainable Identity! Fast Company
Startups, Make Noise or Die Wired News
PR Firms Take on New Role as Internet's Kingmakers San Francisco Business Times

References

Rosen, Emanuel (2000). The Anatomy of Buzz: How to Create Word of Mouth Martketing Doubleday Currency. pg. 16. 

American public relations people
Living people
Year of birth missing (living people)